The extended Cannon family has had strong regional and national political influence in Canada for over a century and is considered to be influential as one of Canada's hereditary ruling class families, members having served in positions as lawyers, judges, Supreme Court judges, senators, ministers of defence, solicitors general, and Members of Parliament. They have had large influence in the national resource industries, as "barons" in the lumber industry particularly, as well as in broadcasting.

Notable members
Lawrence Arthur Dumoulin Cannon (1877 – 1939)), long-time Liberal politician and Supreme Court judge
Lucien Cannon (1887 – 1950), Liberal MP and Solicitor General of Canada.
Charles-Arthur Dumoulin Cannon (1905 – 976),  Liberal MP
Lawrence Cannon (1947-), is a Canadian politician from Quebec and Prime Minister Stephen Harper's Quebec lieutenant.